Barycz  is a village in the administrative district of Gmina Dobroń, within Pabianice County, Łódź Voivodeship, in central Poland.

The village has a population of 210.

References

Barycz